Cleveland Township, Kansas may refer to:

 Cleveland Township, Barton County, Kansas
 Cleveland Township, Marshall County, Kansas
 Cleveland Township, Stafford County, Kansas

See also 
 List of Kansas townships
 Cleveland Township (disambiguation)

Kansas township disambiguation pages